The rivalry between the De La Salle University (DLSU) Green Archers and the University of Santo Tomas (UST) Growling Tigers is contested at the University Athletic Association of the Philippines (UAAP). Although the men's basketball rivalry had died down after the 1990s, it returned in 2013 as both schools again met in the UAAP basketball championship series. The rivalry had also been apparent in women's volleyball where the two teams are frequent finalists in the UAAP Volleyball Championship and the Shakey's V-League.

History 
Prior to La Salle joining the UAAP the two schools met in the championship of the 1948–49 season of the National Seniors Open, a yearly tournament of top collegiate and commercial teams in the country. La Salle defeated UST in overtime to win the title.

The rivalry returned on consecutive UAAP Finals series in men's basketball. La Salle was defeated three consecutive years in the Finals from 1994 through 1996 capping UST's four-year title run. UST was finally dethroned by La Salle during the 1997 semifinals. In 1998 La Salle again eliminated UST in the semifinals to begin their own four-year championship streak. La Salle bounced back defeating UST in overtime for the 1999 UAAP basketball title. The Game 1 finals victory was their last against La Salle until 2007 when UST won in overtime during regular season; La Salle went on to win the 2007 UAAP title. At this point UST's basketball program regressed, but they won a championship against the Ateneo Blue Eagles in three games in 2006. La Salle was suspended in 2006 after admitting they had unknowingly fielded two ineligible players in the previous seasons. La Salle would then win all games until 2011. La Salle again defeated UST in overtime during the UAAP Season 76 basketball championship in 2013.

The rivalry carried over to women's volleyball in the UAAP and Shakey's V-League. The Lady Spikers and the Tigresses met three times in the championship of the Shakey's V-League tournament with UST winning the first and La Salle winning the latter two. The Tigresses have won 5 championships while the Lady Spikers have 3 under their belt.

In the UAAP, the DLSU Lady Spikers and the UST Tigresses met in the Finals for two consecutive seasons – Season 72 (won by UST) and Season 73 (won by La Salle), although UST has seen fluctuation in season-long performances in women's volleyball amidst the rise of contemporary contenders such as Ateneo, FEU and National University. Both schools, however, met in the semifinals in Season 79 (won by La Salle) and Season 81 (won by UST), the latter of which ended La Salle's decade-long streak of finals appearances by 2019 (running from 2009 to 2018), the most in the Final Four era of the UAAP.

Men's basketball 
Both teams are guaranteed to face each other at the elimination round (regular season) twice, while they can meet for a maximum of three times in the playoffs. The games were played consistently from 1986 until 2006 when La Salle was suspended for fielding two ineligible players. UST and La Salle previously met each other when they were members of the NCAA from 1924 to 1936.

 Notes

Women's volleyball 

Both teams are expected to meet at least two times per year in UAAP volleyball tournaments.

 Notes

See also 
 Ateneo–La Salle rivalry
 UP–UST rivalry
 De La Salle Green Archers
 DLSU Lady Spikers
 UST Growling Tigers men's basketball
 UST Golden Tigresses women's volleyball

References
 UAAP historical results
 59th UAAP Season—Tournament Recap

University of Santo Tomas
University Athletic Association of the Philippines rivalries
De La Salle University